George Braith (born George Timothy Braithwaite on June 26, 1939) is a soul-jazz saxophonist from New York.

Career
Braith is known for playing multiple horns at once, a technique pioneered by Roland Kirk. Braith is credited with the invention of the Braithophone, two different horns (straight alto and soprano) mended together by extensions, valves and connections.

Braith is featured in a mosaic in the 72nd street station of the Second Avenue Subway in the New York City Subway system.

Of Braith's album Musart Thom Jurek at AllMusic wrote, "Musart is his masterpiece; it is one of the most diverse yet refined albums to come out of the '60s, and has few peers even today."

Discography

As leader
 Soul Stream (Blue Note, 1963)
 Two Souls in One (Blue Note, 1963)
 Extension (Blue Note, 1964)
 Laughing Soul (Prestige, 1966)
 Musart (Prestige, 1967)
 Double Your Pleasure (Bellaphon, 1992)
 The Complete Blue Note Sessions (2001)
 Barcelona Blues (Excellence, 2006)
 Boptronics (Excellence, 2006)
 George Braith & Friends (Excellence, 2006)
 Bip Bop Bam (Excellence, 2006)
 Bop Rock Blues (Excellence, 2007)

As sideman
With John Patton
 Blue John (Blue Note, 1963)
 Eagle Eye Blues (Excellence, 2001)

References

External links
 Official site
 "George Braith: The Man Who Also Cried Fire"  Kelsey, C. JazzTimes, March 2004.

Living people
1939 births
Jazz musicians from New York (state)
Musicians from the Bronx
21st-century American saxophonists
American jazz saxophonists
American male saxophonists
Blue Note Records artists
Prestige Records artists
Post-bop saxophonists
Soul-jazz saxophonists
21st-century American male musicians
American male jazz musicians